Windmill Cottage is a historic house and former windmill at 144 Division Street in East Greenwich, Rhode Island. It was the home of George Washington Greene, a former American consul to Rome and historian. It was purchased for Greene by his friend, the poet Henry Wadsworth Longfellow.

History
The house was built around 1790. Poet Henry Wadsworth Longfellow bought the cottage in 1866 for his friend, historian George Washington Greene, and had a circa–1818 windmill moved to the site in 1870 and attached to the cottage. The site was added to the National Register of Historic Places in 1973.

Longfellow first met Greene while traveling from Toulon to Pisa. Greene had moved to Italy for his health and the two bonded over a common interest in Italian language, antiquities, and contemporary art. It was Greene who first introduced Longfellow to the Italian poet Dante Alighieri. In the 1860s, Greene was one of the members of the "Dante Club", a group of scholars who assisted Longfellow in his translation of Divine Comedy.

The windmill allegedly inspired Longfellow's poem, "The Windmill." About ten years after it was attached to the home, Longfellow sent Greene a copy of the poem and, in a letter dated April 18, 1880, speculated "I think this is the first ever poem on the subject." It was published in The Youth's Companion issue for May 27, 1880, edited by Hezekiah Butterworth.

See also
National Register of Historic Places listings in Kent County, Rhode Island

References

Houses completed in 1790
Houses on the National Register of Historic Places in Rhode Island
Smock mills in the United States
Houses in Kent County, Rhode Island
Buildings and structures in East Greenwich, Rhode Island
Agricultural buildings and structures on the National Register of Historic Places
Octagonal buildings in the United States
Windmills completed in 1870
Agricultural buildings and structures on the National Register of Historic Places in Rhode Island
Windmills in Rhode Island
National Register of Historic Places in Kent County, Rhode Island
Historic district contributing properties in Rhode Island
Greene family of Rhode Island
Windmills on the National Register of Historic Places